Mavegro Futebol Clube, formerly called Ténis Clube de Bissau, is a Guinea-Bissauan football club based in Bissau. They play in the Campeonato Nacional da Guine-Bissau.

They were runners-up in the Campeonato Nacional da Guine-Bissau in 2008. They have the Taça Nacional da Guiné Bissau won on three occasions: 1994 (as Ténis Clube de Bissau), 2002, and 2004. They may also have been runners-up in 2000, but it is not certain that the competition was played in that year.

Achievements
Taça Nacional da Guiné Bissau: 1
 1994

References

Football clubs in Guinea-Bissau
Sport in Bissau